Bhusawal is the largest municipal council (established in 1882) in the Jalgaon district of the Indian state of Maharashtra, situated along the banks of the river Tapi. The city emerged as a major railway junction during the British Raj, and still remains the administrative headquarters of the Bhusawal Division of the Central Railways. The city is well known for its unparalleled quality of bananas, which have a GI tag. the city is divided into 47 wards. The area covered under the city is 13.38 sq.km.

Geography

Bhusawal is situated on the banks of the Tapi river, also known as the Tapti river. Tapi flows through Central India, between the Satpura Range and the Ajanta Hills of the Deccan Plateau. It a major river in the Indian peninsula, with a length of around 724 kilometres (450 miles), originating at the Betul district in Madhya Pradesh. Tapi, along with Narmada and Mahi, flows from the East to the West. Bhusawal, being located on the North-Western region of the state of Maharashtra, and being bounded by mountain ranges, has a diverse climate, though the city has dry and hot weather for most of the year.

Topography 
Bhusawal is located at 21°02'50.56"N 75°47'15.99"E. It has an average elevation of 209 metres. The city lies on the banks of the Tapi River, falling in the valley between the Satpura ranges and the Ajanta hills of the Deccan Plateau. The total land area of the municipal council is 228.57 sq.km.

Demographics

The population is 187,421 (2011 census), with 96,147 males and 91,274 females. The literacy rate is 88.38%, 91.74% for the males, and 84.87% for the females. Hinduism is the main religion followed by 64.06% of its population, followed by Muslims (24.40%) and Buddhists (8.79%).

Climate 
The city has very dry and hot weather. In summers, the temperature reaches around 46 °C to 49 °C, which is amongst the highest in India. In 2010, the temperature crossed the 49 °C mark, touching 49.8 °C. In winters, the temperature falls down to 15 °C to 16 °C, and receives moderate rainfall during the monsoon.

Transport 

The Ajanta Caves are about 63 km (via Jamner) from Bhusawal.

Road

Bhusawal is situated near the NH 53 highway. The city is very old and has narrow roads, due to which there is slow movement of traffic.

Rail 
Bhusawal Junction Railway Station is a divisional headquarters of the Central Railways. It is on both the Howrah-Allahabad-Mumbai line and the Howrah-Nagpur-Mumbai line. The Bhusawal Railway Yard is the second largest railway yard in Asia, after the Pandit Din Dayal Upadhyay Junction Railway Yard, Mughalsarai. Bhusawal is the closest junction to Ajanta (83 km away).

Air 
Jalgaon Airport is the closest airport to Bhusawal.

Economy
The Railway Coach Factory has been planned to be built here. The city has 2 ordinance factories, out of the 41 factories in India. Bhusawal has a major military base as well. The city has 5 thermal power station units, out of which 4 are operational together with a capacity of over 1420 MW, thus, making it a major contributor to the state's overall electricity generation, providing over 12% of Maharashtra's total power output. A 6th new 660 MW unit is proposed to be developed, which would then take the city's power output to over 2000 MW.

Major industrial facilities include:
 Bhusawal Thermal Power Station (7 km)
 Ordnance Factory Bhusawal (8.3 km)
 Ordnance Factory Varangaon
 Orient Cement Grinding Unit (12 km)
 Indian Oil Corporation Limited Depot (15 km)
 Railway's Zonal Training School
 Electric Locomotive Workshop Bhusawal

Bhusawal is known for its banana cultivation. The city is a major exporter of banana, with more than 40% of the state's banana cultivation in the Jalgaon district. Traders visit Bhusawal to buy raw bananas. Bhusawal is also known for its special white brinjals (eggplant).

See also

 Bhusawal Junction railway station
 Bhusawal Railway Division
 Bhusawal Thermal Power Station
 Bhusawal (Vidhan Sabha constituency)

References 

 
Talukas in Maharashtra
Cities and towns in Jalgaon district